James L. Seward (born August 11, 1951) was a Republican New York State Senator from 1987 to 2020. Seward was first elected to represent the 50th District in 1986. In his final term he represented the 51st District, which consists of Schoharie, Otsego, and Cortland Counties, as well as parts of Tompkins, Herkimer, Chenango, Cayuga, Delaware, and Ulster Counties.

Early life and career
Seward was born in Oneonta, New York and attended Oneonta public schools. He went on to Hartwick College in Oneonta and graduated with a Bachelor of Arts in political science. He also studied at the Nelson Rockefeller Institute of SUNY Albany.

Seward has served as a Milford town justice and as chairman of the Otsego County Republican Committee. He was a delegate to the Republican National Convention in 1976, 1980, and 1988, and was also an alternate delegate in 1996. Seward and his wife Cynthia (née Milavec) reside in Milford, New York. The Sewards have two grown children, Ryan and Lauren.

Senate career
Seward was elected to the state senate in 1986 and was appointed chairman of the Senate Energy and Telecommunications Committee. In 1999, Seward became chairman of the Senate Standing Committee on Insurance.

In 2007, Seward was asked by former Senate Majority Leader Joseph Bruno to assume a post in the senate leadership team as majority whip.  In 2011, Senator Republican Leader Dean G. Skelos asked him to assume the position of assistant majority leader on conference operations.

Seward voted against a same-sex marriage bill on December 2, 2009; the bill was defeated. He voted against legislation allowing same-sex marriage in New York again in 2011, but the bill was passed in a narrow 33-29 vote.

In November 2019, Seward announced that he was being treated for a recurrence of bladder cancer. In January 2020, he announced that he would not seek re-election.

See also
 2009 New York State Senate leadership crisis

References

External links
 New York State Senate: James L. Seward Seward's New York State Senate site
 James L. Seward Sewards's personal senate site

1951 births
Living people
Republican Party New York (state) state senators
People from Oneonta, New York
21st-century American politicians
20th-century American politicians
Hartwick College alumni